Sextus Varius Marcellus (c. 165 – c. 215) was a Roman aristocrat and politician from the province of Syria.

Family and career
Little is known about the origins of Marcellus, other than he was born and raised in the city of Apamea in Syria. Marcellus was a Roman citizen from the Equestrian order.

Marcellus had a long and distinguished political career. He was present at the Secular Games in Rome in 204. From 200 to 205, like Gaius Julius Avitus Alexianus, Marcellus did not serve in a significant Roman military or political position, probably due to Roman emperor Lucius Septimius Severus views about him being influenced by the Praetorian prefect Gaius Fulvius Plautianus. When Plautianus was killed in 205, Marcellus' career was able to move ahead.

From 205 to about 207, Marcellus was a Procurator for the Roman aqueducts in Rome, a position usually given to Romans of Senatorial rank, not from the Equestrian class. Marcellus was paid about 100,000 sesterces per year.

Marcellus proved his worth and capabilities in his position to Emperor Severus and his family. In 208 the emperor promoted him to Procurator of Roman Britain and in this position he was responsible for gathering taxes for Rome. He earned 200,000 sesterces in this role. Later he was promoted by the emperor to managing the finances of Roman Britain earning 300,000 sesterces.

In 211 after the death of Lucius Septimius Severus, his sons Caracalla and Publius Septimius Geta succeeded their father on the Roman throne. Caracalla recalled Marcellus from Roman Britain to Rome and briefly placed him in the roles of Praefectus urbi and Praetorian prefect. He was later admitted into the Senate and, soon after, became praefectus of the military treasury. He later became governor of Numidia and held this post until his death.

Marriage and children
Marcellus married the Syrian Roman noblewoman Julia Soaemias Bassiana who was the first daughter of the powerful Syrian nobles Julia Maesa and Gaius Julius Avitus Alexianus. The maternal aunt of Soaemias was the Roman empress Julia Domna; her maternal uncle-in-marriage was the Roman emperor Lucius Septimius Severus; her maternal cousins were the Roman emperors Caracalla and Publius Septimius Geta and she was the maternal aunt of the Roman emperor Alexander Severus. Through marriage, Marcellus was related both to the Severan dynasty of the Roman Empire and the royal family of Emesa, Syria.

Their marriage may have taken place in 192 or 194, or even perhaps around 200. Marcellus and Soaemias’ marriage may have been arranged to strengthen Lucius Septimius Severus’ position in the Roman East.

Soaemias and Marcellus bore the following children who were born and raised in Rome:
 An unnamed child, who was their first son and child. The first son was named after the unnamed father of Marcellus
 Sextus Varius Avitus Bassianus, who became the Severan Roman emperor Elagabalus from 218 until 222.

Epigraphic evidence
Inscriptional evidence has survived on Marcellus. After his death in c. 215, his wife Julia Soaemias Bassiana and their two sons, dedicated to him a tombstone which was found in Velletri, not far from Rome. The tombstone has two preserved bilingual inscriptions in Latin and Greek, which were first published at Rome in 1765. The inscriptions reveal his political career, his various titles, designations and distinctions he received.

To Sextus Varius Marcellus
procurator centenarius of the water supply, procurator ducenarius of Britain, procurator 
trecenarius of the private purse, acting as praetorian prefect and praefectus urbi,
senator, prefect of the military treasury, commander of the Third legion Augusta, 
governor of Numidia,
has Julia Soaemias Bassiana, daughter of Gaius, with her sons, 
[dedicated this] to her husband and dearest father.

Marcellus was known in dedicating an inscription to Bel in Vasio (Vaison) in Gaul. The bilingual inscription which is in Greek and Latin on an altar, dedicated by him is honoring Bel in remembrance of the oracles given to him in Apamea.

Posthumous honor
The Baths of Varius (Thermae Varianae) in Rome were named in honor of Marcellus and his second son. Their namesake baths were bestowed upon the place, by the Legio XIII Gemina.

Severan dynasty family tree

References

Sources
 F. Millar, The Roman Near East: 31 BC-AD 337, Harvard University Press, 1993 
 J. Hazel, Who's Who in the Roman World, Psychology Press, 2002
 A.R. Birley, Septimius Severus: The African Emperor, Routledge, 2002
 T. Bioy, Late Achaemenid and Hellenistic Babylon, Peeters Publishers, 2004
 B. Levick, Julia Domna: Syrian Empress, Routledge, 2007
 M. Bunsen, Encyclopedia of the Roman Empire, Infobase Printing, 2009
 L. de Arrizabalaga y Prado, The Emperor Elagabalus: Fact or Fiction?, Cambridge University Press, 2010

2nd-century Romans
3rd-century Romans
160s births
210s deaths
Year of birth uncertain
Year of death uncertain
Ancient Roman equites

Ancient Romans in Britain
Emesene dynasty
People of Roman Syria
Senators of the Roman Empire
Marcellus, Sextus